Bent Persson (born 6 September 1947) is Swedish jazz trumpeter and cornetist, internationally renowned for his renditions on three CDs (and LPs) of Louis Armstrong's "50 Hot Choruses" published for Melrose Brothers in Chicago 1927.

References

Other sources
 The New Grove Dictionary of Jazz - vol.2, 
 Jazz: the essential companion Ian Carr/ Fairweather/ Pristley, Paladin, 
 Satchmo - The genius of Louis Armstrong, Gary Giddins, Da Capo Press, 2001, 
 Bonniers Musiklexikon 2003
 Svensk Jazzhistoria / Erik Kjellberg 1985

1947 births
Living people
Swedish jazz trumpeters
Male trumpeters
Jazz cornetists
21st-century trumpeters
21st-century Swedish male musicians
Male jazz musicians
Union Rhythm Kings members
Stomp Off artists